Middlewood railway station serves the village of High Lane in the Metropolitan Borough of Stockport, Greater Manchester, England.

It is on the Stockport to Buxton line, opened in 1879 by the London and North Western Railway on the Stockport, Disley and Whaley Bridge Railway which they had acquired in 1866.  The construction and opening of the station was concurrent with the construction and opening of the adjacent  station on the  Macclesfield, Bollington and Marple Railway to provide an interchange for passengers wishing to travel between Macclesfield and Buxton with the two stations linked by a flight of steps.  Originally named as Middlewood for Norbury the station was renamed three times. In 1899 it became Middlewood for High Lane; then in 1951 it was retitled Middlewood Lower before becoming simply Middlewood in 1968.

The station is managed and served by Northern and is the last station in the Transport for Greater Manchester ticketing area.

There is no vehicular access to the station. It is one of the three stations that provide access to the Middlewood Way.

In July 2009, Poynton Town Council announced that they would be part funding with the aid of a grant from the High Peak and Hope Valley Community Rail Partnership, the installation of a Cycle Rack and Improved Signage to and at the station. These improvements have now been implemented, along with the installation of additional lighting, a new PA system and a Hearing Induction Loop.

In June 2016, a landslip at the station following heavy rain meant that all services were  suspended between Hazel Grove and Buxton until 25 June. Parts of the track and platform were both affected.

Service
There is a generally a two-hourly service each day, including Sundays, to Manchester Piccadilly northbound and to Buxton southbound, with additional services at peak periods. Other trains pass through the station without stopping.

References

External links

Railway stations in the Metropolitan Borough of Stockport
DfT Category F2 stations
Former London and North Western Railway stations
Northern franchise railway stations
Railway stations in Great Britain without road access
Railway stations in Great Britain opened in 1879